Sukhia Tuimalealiifano Go is a Fijian businesswoman. She holds a degree in management and economics from the University of the South Pacific, and in 2015 she completed a post graduate qualification in human resources management.

Life 
In 2012, Go decided to open a business with her mother. Together they founded The Gift Hut, an online business which produces and sells elei, a Samoan form of woodblock printing. In 2014 the company won the Fiji Development Bank's Small Business Award in the Wholesale & Retail category. In 2015, Go won the Aspiring Entrepreneur of the Year Award at the Women in Business Awards.

References

Living people
Year of birth missing (living people)
University of the South Pacific alumni
Fijian businesspeople